The following is a list of churches in Bournemouth, a coastal resort town on the south coast of England.

Active 

Bournemouth, Liberal Catholic Church of St. Raphael
Moordown Baptist
Moordown, Church of the Nazarene
Northbourne, New Life Christian Fellowship
Rosebery Park Baptist Church
St Christopher's Church, Southbourne
St Nicholas' Church, Southbourne‎ 
Church of St Francis of Assisi, Charminster
St Ambrose's Church, Westbourne
St Barnabas' Church, Bournemouth
St Francis of Assisi's Church, Bournemouth
St Katharine's Church, Southbourne
St James's Church, Pokesdown
St John the Baptist's Church, Moordown
St Luke's Church, Winton
St Mark's Church, Bournemouth
St Michael's Church, Bournemouth
St Peter's Church, Bournemouth
St Saviour's Church, Iford
 St Stephen's Church, Bournemouth
St Swithun's Church, Bournemouth
St Thomas's Church, Bournemouth
Church of St Thomas More, Iford
Church of Our Lady of Victories and St Bernadette, Bournemouth
West Cliff Baptist Church
Victoria Park Methodist
Winton, Christadelphian Church
Winton Baptist
Winton, Church of Christ the Saviour
Winton Methodist
Winton, Bournemouth Community Church Centre
Winton, United Reformed church
New Life Christian Fellowship, East Howe Lane

Former 

 East Howe Congregational Church
 Ensbury Park Methodist Church
Punshon Memorial Methodist Church, Exeter Road
Saint Andrews, Exeter Road
Wallisdown Road Methodist Church
Bournemouth Unitarian church, 101 West Hill Road
Moordown, former Congregational Church

References 

Bournemouth
Bournemouth
Bournemouth